The 2015 Seattle Mariners season was the 39th season in franchise history. The Mariners played their 16th full season (17th overall) at Safeco Field and finished the season with a record of 76–86.

The Mariners played 23 extra-inning games during the season, the most of any MLB team in 2015.

Offseason

Signed Nelson Cruz to a four-year, $57 million deal on December 1, 2014.

Standings

American League West

American League Wild Card

Record against opponents

Season summary

Game log

|- bgcolor="bbffbb"
| 1 || April 6 || Angels || 4–1 || Hernández (1–0) || Weaver (0–1) || Rodney (1) || 45,909 || 1–0
|- bgcolor="ffbbbb"
| 2 || April 7 || Angels || 0–2 || Wilson (1–0) || Paxton (0–1) || Street (1) || 26,545 || 1–1
|- bgcolor="ffbbbb"
| 3 || April 8 || Angels || 3–5 || Shoemaker (1–0) || Iwakuma (0–1) || Street (2) || 25,495 || 1–2
|- bgcolor="ffbbbb"
| 4 || April 10 || @ Athletics || 0–12 || Pomeranz (1–0) || Walker (0–1) || — || 30,114 || 1–3
|- bgcolor="bbffbb"
| 5 || April 11 || @ Athletics || 5–4 (11) || Olson (1–0) || Abad (0–1) || Rodney (2) || 24,355 || 2–3
|- bgcolor="bbffbb"
| 6 || April 12 || @ Athletics || 8–7 (10) || Rodney (1–0) || Clippard (0–1) || Medina (1) || 32,282 || 3–3
|- bgcolor="ffbbbb"
| 7 || April 13 || @ Dodgers || 5–6 (10) || Garcia (1–0) || Leone (0–1) || — || 42,202 || 3–4
|- bgcolor="ffbbbb"
| 8 || April 14 || @ Dodgers || 5–6 || Garcia (2–0) || Rodney (1–1) || — || 43,115 || 3–5
|- bgcolor="ffbbbb"
| 9 || April 15 || @ Dodgers || 2–5 || Anderson (1–0) || Walker (0–2) || — || 51,287 || 3–6
|- bgcolor="ffbbbb"
| 10 || April 17 || Rangers || 1–3 || Gallardo (2–1) || Happ (0–1) || Feliz (2) || 36,606 || 3–7
|- bgcolor="bbffbb"
| 11 || April 18 || Rangers || 3–1 || Hernández (2–0)  || Lewis (1–1) || Rodney (3) || 43,017 || 4–7
|- bgcolor="bbffbb"
| 12 || April 19 || Rangers || 11–10 || Medina (1–0) || Feliz (0–1) || — || 31,601 || 5–7
|- bgcolor="ffbbbb"
| 13 || April 20 || Astros || 5–7 || Sipp (1–0) || Farquhar (0–1) || Gregerson (3) || 15,129 || 5–8
|- bgcolor="ffbbbb"
| 14 || April 21 || Astros || 3–6 || McHugh (3–0) || Furbush (0–1) || Qualls (1) || 13,949 || 5–9
|- bgcolor="bbffbb"
| 15 || April 22 || Astros || 3–2 || Happ (1–1) || Hernández (0–2) || Rodney (4)|| 14,756 || 6–9
|- bgcolor="bbffbb"
| 16 || April 24 || Twins || 2–0 || Hernández (3–0) || Hughes (0–4) || — || 25,215 || 7–9
|- bgcolor="ffbbbb"
| 17 || April 25 || Twins || 5–8 || Stauffer (1–0) || Paxton (0–2) || Perkins (4) || 33,566 || 7–10
|- bgcolor="ffbbbb"
| 18 || April 26 || Twins || 2–4 (11) || Fien (1–1) || Olson (1–1) || Perkins (5) || 35,242 || 7–11
|- bgcolor="bbffbb"
| 19 || April 27 || @ Rangers || 3–1 || Walker (1–2) || Gallardo (2–3) || Rodney (5) || 19,748 || 8–11
|- bgcolor="bbffbb"
| 20 || April 28 || @ Rangers || 2–1 || Happ (2–1) || Detwiler (0–3) || Rodney (6) || 23,714 || 9–11
|- bgcolor="bbffbb"
| 21 || April 29 || @ Rangers || 5–2 || Hernández (4–0) || Rodríguez (0–1) || Rodney (7) || 26,037 || 10–11
|- bgcolor="ffbbbb"
| 22 || April 30 || @ Astros || 2–3 (10) || Gregerson (2–0) || Leone (0–2) || — || 19,108 || 10–12
|-

|- bgcolor="ffbbbb"
| 23 || May 1 || @ Astros || 3–4 || Fields (1–0) || Elias (0–1) || Gregerson (5) || 21,834 || 10–13
|- bgcolor="ffbbbb"
| 24 || May 2 || @ Astros || 4–11 || McHugh (4–0) || Walker (1–3) || — || 24,435 || 10–14
|- bgcolor="ffbbbb"
| 25 || May 3 || @ Astros || 6–7 || Neshek (2–0) || Smith (0–1) || Gregerson (6) || 25,283 || 10–15
|- bgcolor="bbffbb"
| 26 || May 4 || @ Angels || 3–2 || Hernández (5–0) || Shoemaker (2–2) || Rodney (8) || 25,024 || 11–15
|- bgcolor="ffbbbb"
| 27 || May 5 || @ Angels || 4–5 || Street (1–0) || Leone (0–3) || — || 33,394 || 11–16
|- bgcolor="ffbbbb"
| 28 || May 6 || @ Angels || 3–4 || Street (2–0) || Smith (0–2) || — || 25,160 || 11–17
|- bgcolor="bbffbb"
| 29 || May 8 || Athletics || 4–3 (11) || Smith (1–2) || Otero (2–2) || — || 25,187 || 12–17
|- bgcolor="bbffbb"
| 30 || May 9 || Athletics || 7–2 || Happ (3–1) || Hahn (1–3) || — || 37,441 || 13–17
|- bgcolor="bbffbb"
| 31 || May 10 || Athletics || 4–3 || Hernández (6–0) || Chavez (1–3) || Rodney (9) || 42,831 || 14–17
|- bgcolor="bbffbb"
| 32 || May 12 || Padres || 11–4 || Paxton (1–2) || Kennedy (2–2) || — || 16,148 || 15–17
|- bgcolor="ffbbbb"
| 33 || May 13 || Padres || 2–4 || Shields (5–0) || Walker (1–4) || Kimbrel (10) || 14,547 || 15–18
|- bgcolor="ffbbbb"
| 34 || May 14 || Red Sox || 1–2 || Barnes (2–0) || Rodney (1–2) || Uehara (8) || 20,172 || 15–19
|- bgcolor="bbffbb"
| 35 || May 15 || Red Sox || 2–1 || Wilhelmsen (1–0) || Layne (0–1) || — || 39,477 || 16–19
|- bgcolor="ffbbbb"
| 36 || May 16 || Red Sox || 2–4 || Porcello (4–2) || Hernández (6–1) || Uehara (9) || 45,055 || 16–20
|- bgcolor="bbffbb"
| 37 || May 17 || Red Sox || 5–0 || Paxton (2–2) || Wright (1–1) || — || 39.936 || 17–20
|- bgcolor="ffbbbb"
| 38 || May 19 || @ Orioles || 4–9 || González (5–2) || Farquhar (0–2) || — || 19,494 || 17–21
|- bgcolor="bbffbb"
| 39 || May 20 || @ Orioles || 4–2 || Elias (1–1) || Chen (1–3) || Rodney (10) || 21,710 || 18–21
|- bgcolor="ffbbbb"
| 40 || May 21 || @ Orioles || 4–5 || Hunter (2–1) || Farquhar (0–3) || Britton (9) || 33,085 || 18–22
|- bgcolor="bbffbb"
| 41 || May 22 || @ Blue Jays || 4–3 || Hernández (7–1) || Estrada (1–3) || Rodney (11) || 21,195 || 19–22
|- bgcolor="bbffbb"
| 42 || May 23 || @ Blue Jays || 3–2 || Paxton (3–2) || Buehrle (5–4) || Rodney (12) || 33,086 || 20–22
|- bgcolor="ffbbbb"
| 43 || May 24 || @ Blue Jays || 2–8 || Sanchez (4–4) || Walker (1–5) || — || 37,929 || 20–23
|- bgcolor="bbffbb"
| 44 || May 25 || @ Rays || 4–1 || Elias (2–1) || Odorizzi (3–5) || Rodney (13) || 10,401 || 21–23
|- bgcolor="bbffbb"
| 45 || May 26 || @ Rays || 7–6 (10) || Rodney (2–2) || Boxberger (2–2) || Beimel (1) || 9,628 || 22–23
|- bgcolor="bbffbb"
| 46 || May 27 || @ Rays || 3–0 || Hernández (8–1) || Boxberger (2–3) || — || 10,365 || 23–23
|- bgcolor="ffbbbb"
| 47 || May 28 || Indians || 3–5 || Kluber (3–5) || Paxton (3–3) || Allen (10) || 19,449 || 23–24
|- bgcolor="bbffbb"
| 48 || May 29 || Indians || 2–1 || Walker (2–5) || Bauer (4–2) || Rodney (14) || 32,454 || 24–24
|- bgcolor="ffbbbb"
| 49 || May 30 || Indians || 3–4 || Marcum (2–0) || Elias (2–2) || Allen (11) || 32,287 || 24–25
|- bgcolor="ffbbbb"
| 50 || May 31 || Indians || 3–6 (12) || McAllister (1-2) || Leone (0-4) || Adams (1) || 32,112 || 24–26
|-

|- bgcolor="ffbbbb"
| 51 || June 1 || Yankees || 2–7 || Pineda (7–2) || Hernández (8–2) || — || 26,082 || 24–27
|- bgcolor="ffbbbb"
| 52 || June 2 || Yankees || 3–5 (11) || Wilson (2–0) || Wilhelmsen (1–1) || Miller (16) || 27,442 || 24–28
|- bgcolor="ffbbbb"
| 53 || June 3 || Yankees || 1–3 || Tanaka (3–1) || Walker (2–6) || Miller (17) || 32,701 || 24–29
|- bgcolor="ffbbbb"
| 54 || June 4 || Rays || 1–2 || Ramírez (4–2) || Elías (2–3) || Jepsen (2) || 16,096 || 24–30
|- bgcolor="ffbbbb"
| 55 || June 5 || Rays || 0–1 || Bellatti (2–0) || Rodney (2–3) || Jepsen (3) || 20,695 || 24–31
|- bgcolor="bbffbb"
| 56 || June 6 || Rays || 2–1 || Hernández (9–2) || Geltz (1–2) || Smith (1) || 31,106 || 25–31
|- bgcolor="ffbbbb"
| 57 || June 7 || Rays || 1–3 || Archer (7–4) || Montgomery (0–1) || Jepsen (4) || 27,906 || 25–32
|- bgcolor="bbffbb"
| 58 || June 9 || @ Indians || 3–2 || Elias (3–3) || Kluber (3–7) || Smith (2) || 11,425 || 26–32
|- bgcolor="bbffbb"
| 59 || June 10 || @ Indians || 9–3 || Walker (3–6) || Bauer (5–3) || — || 12,305 || 27–32
|- bgcolor="ffbbbb"
| 60 || June 11 || @ Indians || 0–6 || Marcum (3–1) || Happ (3–2) || — || 15,316 || 27–33
|- bgcolor="ffbbbb"
| 61 || June 12 || @ Astros || 0–10 || Oberholtzer (1–1) || Hernández (9–3) || — || 32,173 || 27–34
|- bgcolor="bbffbb"
| 62 || June 13 || @ Astros || 8–1 || Montgomery (1–1) || McHugh (6–3) || — || 36,762 || 28–34
|- bgcolor="ffbbbb"
| 63 || June 14 || @ Astros || 0–13 || McCullers (3–1) || Elias (3–4) || — || 29,153 || 28–35
|- bgcolor="bbffbb"
| 64 || June 15 || @ Giants || 5–1 || Walker (4–6) || Hudson (4–6) || — || 42,099 || 29–35
|- bgcolor="ffbbbb"
| 65 || June 16 || @ Giants || 2–6 || Lincecum (7–3) || Happ (3–3) || — || 41,267 || 29–36
|- bgcolor="bbffbb"
| 66 || June 17 || Giants || 2–0 || Hernández (10–3) || Bumgarner (7–4) || Smith (3) || 34,844 || 30–36
|- bgcolor="ffbbbb"
| 67 || June 18 || Giants || 0–7 || Vogelsong (5–5) || Montgomery (1–2) || — || 34,354 || 30–37
|- bgcolor="bbffbb"
| 68 || June 19 || Astros || 5–2 || Elias (4–4) || McCullers (3–2) || Smith (4) || 40,914 || 31–37
|- bgcolor="bbffbb"
| 69 || June 20 || Astros || 6–3 || Walker (5–6) || Keuchel (8–3) || Smith (5) || 26,770 || 32–37
|- bgcolor="ffbbbb"
| 70 || June 21 || Astros || 2–6 || Harris (4–0) || Happ (3–4) || — || 40,905 || 32–38
|- bgcolor="ffbbbb"
| 71 || June 22 || Royals || 1–4 || Blanton (2–0) || Hernández (10–4) || Holland (14) || 23,588 || 32–39
|- bgcolor="bbffbb"
| 72 || June 23 || Royals || 7–0 || Montgomery (2–2) || Guthrie (5–5) || — || 17,460 || 33–39
|- bgcolor="ffbbbb"
| 73 || June 24 || Royals || 2–8 || Madson (1–1) || Elias (4–5) || — || 23,392 || 33–40
|- bgcolor="bbffbb"
| 74 || June 26 || @ Angels || 3–1 || Walker (6–6) || Shoemaker (4–6) || Rodney (15) || 41,137 || 34–40
|- bgcolor="ffbbbb"
| 75 || June 27 || @ Angels || 2–4 || Richards (8–5) || Happ (3–5) || Street (21) || 40,514 || 34–41
|- bgcolor="ffbbbb"
| 76 || June 28 || @ Angels || 2–3 (10) || Gott (1–0) || Wilhelmsen (1–2) || — || 38,387 || 34–42
|- bgcolor="bbffbb"
| 77 || June 30 || @ Padres || 5–0 || Montgomery (3–2) || Kennedy (4–7) || — || 30,368 || 35–42
|-

|- bgcolor="bbffbb"
| 78 || July 1 || @ Padres || 7–0 || Walker (7–6) || Shields (7–3) || — || 30,251 || 36–42
|- bgcolor="ffbbbb"
| 79 || July 2 || @ Athletics || 0–4 || Kazmir (5–5) || Elias (4–6) || — || 13,062 || 36–43
|- bgcolor="bbffbb"
| 80 || July 3 || @ Athletics || 9–5 || Happ (4–5) || Chavez (4–8) || — || 35,067 || 37–43
|- bgcolor="ffbbbb"
| 81 || July 4 || @ Athletics || 0–2 || Graveman (6–4) || Hernández (10–5) || Clippard (15) || 18,915 || 37–44
|- bgcolor="bbffbb"
| 82 || July 5 || @ Athletics || 2–1 || Montgomery (4–2) || Bassitt (0–2) || Rodney (16) || 22,163 || 38–44
|- bgcolor="ffbbbb"
| 83 || July 6 || Tigers || 5–12 || Simón (8–5) || Guaipe (0–1) || — || 22,580 || 38–45
|- bgcolor="bbffbb"
| 84 || July 7 || Tigers || 7–6 (11) || Furbush (1–1) || Krol (1–2) || — || 21,782 || 39–45
|- bgcolor="ffbbbb"
| 85 || July 8 || Tigers || 4–5 || Sánchez (8–7) || Guaipe (0–2) || Soria (19) || 26,488 || 39–46
|- bgcolor="bbffbb"
| 86 || July 9 || Angels || 7–2 || Hernández (11–5) || Richards (9–6) || Smith (6) || 28,131 || 40–46
|- bgcolor="ffbbbb"
| 87 || July 10 || Angels || 3–7 || Santiago (6–4) || Montgomery (4–3) || — || 29,679 || 40–47
|- bgcolor="bbffbb"
| 88 || July 11 || Angels || 5–0 || Iwakuma (1–1) || Wilson (7–7) || — || 40,765 || 41–47
|- bgcolor="ffbbbb"
| 89 || July 12 || Angels || 3–10 || Heaney (3–0) || Walker (7–7) || — || 36,955 || 41–48
|- bgcolor=#bbb
| – || July 14 || 86th All-Star Game || colspan=6 | National League vs. American League (Great American Ball Park, Cincinnati)
|- bgcolor="ffbbbb"
| 90 || July 17 || @ Yankees || 3–4 || Tanaka (6–3) || Beimel (0–1) || Miller (19) || 47,086 || 41–49
|- bgcolor="bbffbb"
| 91 || July 18 || @ Yankees || 4–3 || Iwakuma (2–1) || Pineda (9–6) || Smith (7) || 46,119 || 42–49
|- bgcolor="ffbbbb"
| 92 || July 19 || @ Yankees || 1–2 || Betances (6–2) || Rodney (2–4) || Miller (20) || 42,926 || 42–50
|- bgcolor="ffbbbb"
| 93 || July 20 || @ Tigers || 4–5 || Alburquerque (1–0) || Lowe (0–1) || Soria (21) || 34,353 || 42–51
|- bgcolor="bbffbb"
| 94 || July 21 || @ Tigers || 11–9 || Beimel (1–1) || Feliz (1–3) || Smith (8) || 34,088 || 43–51
|- bgcolor="ffbbbb"
| 95 || July 22 || @ Tigers || 4–9 || Sánchez (10–7) || Montgomery (4–4) || Soria (22) || 36,670 || 43–52
|- bgcolor="bbffbb"
| 96 || July 23 || @ Tigers || 3–2 (12) || Rodney (3–4) || Krol (1–3) || Wilhelmsen (1) || 40,225 || 44–52
|- bgcolor="bbffbb"
| 97 || July 24 || Blue Jays || 5–2 || Hernández (12–5) || Estrada (7–6) || Smith (9) || 43,328 || 45–52
|- bgcolor="ffbbbb"
| 98 || July 25 || Blue Jays || 6–8 || Sanchez (6–4) || Smith (1–3) || Osuna (5) || 45,027 || 45–53
|- bgcolor="bbffbb"
| 99 || July 26 || Blue Jays || 6–5 (10) || Beimel (2–1) || Loup (2–5) || — || 35,159 || 46–53
|- bgcolor="ffbbbb"
| 100 || July 27 || D-backs || 3–4 (10) || Pérez (2–1) || Smith (1–4) || Chafin (2) || 19,532 || 46–54
|- bgcolor="ffbbbb"
| 101 || July 28 || D-backs || 4–8 || Godley (2–0) || Iwakuma (2–2) || — || 25,106 || 46–55
|- bgcolor="ffbbbb"
| 102 || July 29 || D-backs || 2–8 || Corbin (2–3) || Hernández (12–6) || — || 32,502 || 46–56
|- bgcolor="ffbbbb"
| 103 || July 30 || @ Twins || 5–9 || Hughes (10–6) || Happ (4–6) || — || 30,534 || 46–57
|- bgcolor="bbffbb"
| 104 || July 31 || @ Twins || 6–1 || Walker (8–7) || Milone (5–3) || — || 27,643 || 47–57
|-

|- bgcolor="ffbbbb"
| 105 || August 1 || @ Twins || 2–3 || May (7–7) || Smith (1–5) || — || 36,901 || 47–58
|- bgcolor="bbffbb"
| 106 || August 2 || @ Twins || 4–1 (11) || Rodney (4–4) || Jepsen (2–6) || Wilhelmsen (2) || 30,325 || 48–58
|- bgcolor="bbffbb"
| 107 || August 3 || @ Rockies || 8–7 || Hernández (13–6) || Butler (3–8) || Smith (10) || 33,107 || 49–58
|- bgcolor="bbffbb"
| 108 || August 4 || @ Rockies || 10–4 || Rasmussen (1–0) || Friedrich (0–3) || — || 34,376 || 50–58
|- bgcolor="ffbbbb"
| 109 || August 5 || @ Rockies || 5–7 (11) || Flande (2–1) || Guaipe (0–3) || — || 30,196 || 50–59
|- bgcolor="bbffbb"
| 110 || August 7 || Rangers || 4–3 || Iwakuma (3–2) || Hamels (6–8) || Smith (11) || 29,320 || 51–59
|- bgcolor="ffbbbb"
| 111 || August 8 || Rangers || 3–11 (11) || Tolleson (4–2) || Rasmussen (1–1) || — || 39,132 || 51–60
|- bgcolor="bbffbb"
| 112 || August 9 || Rangers || 4–2 || Hernández (14–6) || Lewis (12–5) || Smith (12) || 29,939 || 52–60
|- bgcolor="ffbbbb"
| 113 || August 10 || Orioles || 2–3 || Chen (6–6) || Nuño (0–2) || Britton (28) || 20,839 || 52–61
|- bgcolor="bbffbb"
| 114 || August 11 || Orioles || 6–5 (10) || Rodney (5–4) || McFarland (0–2) || — || 24,863 || 53–61
|- bgcolor="bbffbb"
| 115 || August 12 || Orioles || 3–0 || Iwakuma (4–2) || Gausman (2–4) || — || 25,661 || 54–61
|- bgcolor="ffbbbb"
| 116 || August 14 || @ Red Sox || 1–15 || Kelly (5–6) || Montgomery (4–5) || — || 37,678 || 54–62
|- bgcolor="ffbbbb"
| 117 || August 15 || @ Red Sox || 10–22 || Miley (9–9) || Hernández (14–7) || — || 36,027 || 54–63
|- bgcolor="bbffbb"
| 118 || August 16 || @ Red Sox || 10–8 (12) || Rasmussen (2–1) || Breslow (0–3) || Farquhar (1) || 35,260 || 55–63
|- bgcolor="ffbbbb"
| 119 || August 17 || @ Rangers || 3–4 || Tolleson (5–2) || Rodney (5–5) || — || 19,880 || 55–64
|- bgcolor="bbffbb"
| 120 || August 18 || @ Rangers || 3–2 || Iwakuma (5–2) || Gonzalez (2–5) || Smith (13) || 26,870 || 56–64
|- bgcolor="ffbbbb"
| 121 || August 19 || @ Rangers || 2–7 || Holland (1–1) || Montgomery (4–6) || — || 20,142 || 56–65
|- bgcolor="ffbbbb"
| 122 || August 21 || White Sox || 4–11 || Sale (12–7) || Hernández (14–8) || — || 35,770 || 56–66
|- bgcolor="ffbbbb"
| 123 || August 22 || White Sox || 3–6 (10) || Jones (1–0) || Farquhar (0–4) || Robertson (25) || 32,085 || 56–67
|- bgcolor="bbffbb"
| 124 || August 23 || White Sox || 8–6 || Walker (9–7) || Danks (6–11) || Wilhelmsen (3) || 30,537 || 57–67
|- bgcolor="ffbbbb"
| 125 || August 24 || Athletics || 5–11 || Mujica (3–4) || Iwakuma (5–3) || — || 17,970 || 57–68
|- bgcolor="bbffbb"
| 126 || August 25 || Athletics || 6–5 || Olmos (1–0) || Chavez (7–13) || Wilhelmsen (4) || 17,498 || 58–68
|- bgcolor="bbffbb"
| 127 || August 26 || Athletics || 8–2 || Hernández (15–8) || Bassitt (1–6) || — || 23,338 || 59–68
|- bgcolor="ffbbbb"
| 128 || August 27 || @ White Sox || 2–4 || Rodon (6–5) || Elias (4–7) || Robertson (27) || 15,076 || 59–69
|- bgcolor="bbffbb"
| 129 || August 28 || @ White Sox || 2–0 || Walker (10–7) || Danks (6–12) || Wilhelmsen (5) || 27,870 || 60–69
|- bgcolor="bbffbb"
| 130 || August 29 || @ White Sox || 7–6 || Iwakuma (6–3) || Samardzija (8–11) || Wilhelmsen (6) || 26,011 || 61–69
|- bgcolor="ffbbbb"
| 131 || August 30 || @ White Sox || 5–6 (11) || Robertson (6–3) || Rollins (0–1) || — || 28,031 || 61–70
|- bgcolor="ffbbbb"
| 132 || August 31 || @ Astros || 3–8 || Keuchel (16–6) || Nuño (0–3) || — || 19,923 || 61–71
|-

|- bgcolor="bbffbb"
| 133 || September 1 || @ Astros || 7–5 || Kensing (1–0) || Neshek (3–4) || Wilhelmsen (7) || 18,157 || 62–71
|- bgcolor="bbffbb"
| 134 || September 2 || @ Astros || 8–3 || Smith (2–5) || Neshek (3–5) || Wilhelmsen (8) || 18,669 || 63–71
|- bgcolor="bbffbb"
| 135 || September 4 || @ Athletics || 11–8 || Ramírez (1–0)  || Brooks (1–2)  || Wilhelmsen (9) || 16,382 || 64–71
|- bgcolor="bbffbb"
| 136 || September 5 || @ Athletics || 8–3 || Hernández (16–8)  || Chavez (7–14)  || — || 27,387 || 65–71
|- bgcolor="bbffbb"
| 137 || September 6 || @ Athletics || 3–2 || Iwakuma (7–3) || Nolin (0–1) || Wilhelmsen (10) || 19,534 || 66–71
|- bgcolor="ffbbbb"
| 138 || September 7 || Rangers || 0–3 || Gallardo (12–9) || Elias (4–8) || Tolleson (30) || 18,469 || 66–72
|- bgcolor="ffbbbb"
| 139 || September 8 || Rangers || 6–9 || Hamels (9–8)  || Walker (10–8)  || Tolleson (31) || 13,389 || 66–73
|- bgcolor="bbffbb"
| 140 || September 9 || Rangers || 6–0 || Nuño (1–3) || Perez (2–5) || — || 14,330 || 67–73
|- bgcolor="bbffbb"
| 141 || September 10 || Rangers || 5–0 || Hernández (17–8) || Holland (3–2) || — || 16,842 || 68–73
|- bgcolor="ffbbbb"
| 142 || September 11 || Rockies || 2–4 || Bettis (7–5) || Iwakuma (7–4) || Axford (22) || 19,876 || 68–74
|- bgcolor="bbffbb"
| 143 || September 12 || Rockies || 7–2 || Elias (5–8) || Flande (3–3) || — || 24,743 || 69–74
|- bgcolor="ffbbbb"
| 144 || September 13 || Rockies || 2–3 || Kendrick (6–12) || Paxton (3–4) || Axford (23) || 21,840 || 69–75
|- bgcolor="bbffbb"
| 145 || September 14 || Angels || 10–1 || Walker (11–8) || Richards (13–11) || — || 13,681 || 70–75
|- bgcolor="ffbbbb"
| 146 || September 15 || Angels || 3–4 || Tropeano (2–2) || Hernández (17–9) || Smith (3) || 15,365 || 70–76
|- bgcolor="bbffbb"
| 147 || September 16 || Angels || 3–1 || Iwakuma (8–4) || Weaver (7–11) || Wilhelmsen (11) || 16,176 || 71–76
|- bgcolor="bbffbb"
| 148 || September 18 || @ Rangers || 3–1 || Farquhar (1–4) || Gallardo (12–11) || Wilhelmsen (12) || 26,727 || 72–76
|- bgcolor="ffbbbb"
| 149 || September 19 || @ Rangers || 1–10 || Hamels (10–8) || Nuño (1–4) || — || 39,843 || 72–77
|- bgcolor="bbffbb"
| 150 || September 20 || @ Rangers || 9–2 || Hernández (18–9) || Holland (3–3) || — || 33,307 || 73–77
|- bgcolor="bbffbb"
| 151 || September 22 || @ Royals || 11–2 || Iwakuma (9–4) || Guthrie (8–8) || — || 29,081 || 74–77
|- bgcolor="ffbbbb"
| 152 || September 23 || @ Royals || 3–4 (10) || Davis (8–1) || Rollins (0–2) || — || 28,756 || 74–78
|- bgcolor="ffbbbb"
| 153 || September 24 || @ Royals || 4–10 || Cueto (10–12) || Kensing (1–1) || — || 32,244 || 74–79
|- bgcolor="ffbbbb"
| 154 || September 25 || @ Angels || 4–8 || Richards (15–11) || Nuño (1–5) || — || 38,355 || 74–80
|- bgcolor="ffbbbb"
| 155 || September 26 || @ Angels || 2–3 || Salas (4–2) || Farquhar (1–5) || — || 37,866 || 74–81
|- bgcolor="ffbbbb"
| 156 || September 27 || @ Angels || 2–3 || Salas (5–2) || Iwakuma (9–5) || Morin (1) || 35,243 || 74–82
|- bgcolor="ffbbbb"
| 157 || September 28 || Astros || 2–3 || McCullers (6–7) || Farquhar (1–6) || Gregerson (30) || 13,935 || 74–83
|- bgcolor="bbffbb"
| 158 || September 29 || Astros || 6–4 || Wilhelmsen (2–2) || Pérez (2–4) || — || 15,331 || 75–83
|- bgcolor="ffbbbb"
| 159 || September 30 || Astros || 6–7 || Sipp (3–4) || Farquhar (1–7) || Gregerson (31) || 14,257 || 75–84
|-

|- bgcolor="ffbbbb"
| 160 || October 2 || Athletics || 2–4 || Brooks (3–4) || Farquhar (1–8) || Doolittle (4) || 26,130 || 75–85
|- bgcolor="ffbbbb"
| 161 || October 3 || Athletics || 5–7 (13) || Venditte (2–2) || Ramirez (1–2) || Doubront (1) || 24,448 || 75–86
|- bgcolor="bbffbb"
| 162 || October 4 || Athletics || 3–2 || Kensing (2–1) || Dull (1–2) || Wilhelmsen (13) || 22,402 || 76–86
|-

|-
| Legend:       = Win       = Loss       = PostponementBold = Mariners team member

Roster

Statistics
Through October 4, 2015

Batting
Note: G = Games played; AB = At bats; R = Runs scored; H = Hits; 2B = Doubles; 3B = Triples; HR = Home runs; RBI = Runs batted in; BB = Base on balls; SO = Strikeouts; AVG = Batting average; SB = Stolen bases

Pitching
Note: W = Wins; L = Losses; ERA = Earned run average; G = Games pitched; GS = Games started; SV = Saves; IP = Innings pitched; H = Hits allowed; R = Runs allowed; ER = Earned runs allowed; HR = Home runs allowed; BB = Walks allowed; K = Strikeouts

Farm system

References

External links

2015 Seattle Mariners season Official Site 
2015 Seattle Mariners season at ESPN
2015 Seattle Mariners season at Baseball Reference

Seattle Mariners seasons
Seattle Mariners season
Seasttle Marin
Seattle Mariners